Events from the year 1659 in art.

Events
Frescoes at the Quirinal Palace in Rome are completed by Pietro da Cortona and his team of artists.

Paintings

 Peter Lely - A Boy as a Shepherd (approximate date)
 Rembrandt 
Jacob Wrestling with the Angel
Self Portrait with Beret and Turned-Up Collar
 Salvator Rosa - Allegory of Fortune
 Adriaen van Ostade - The Fish Market
 Diego Velázquez
 Infanta Margarita Teresa in a Blue Dress
 Portrait of Prince Philip Prospero
 Jan Vermeer - Officer and a Laughing Girl (1657–59)

Births
January 21 - Adriaen van der Werff, Dutch painter of portraits and erotic, devotional and mythological scenes (died 1722)
March 4 - Pierre Lepautre, French sculptor (died 1744)
April 11 - Hendrick van Streeck, Dutch Golden Age painter of church interiors (died 1719)
July 8 - Justus van Huysum, Dutch Golden Age flower painter (died 1716)
July 18 - Hyacinthe Rigaud, French painter of Catalan origin (died 1743)
August 1 - Sebastiano Ricci, Italian painter in the Cortonesque style of grand manner fresco painting (died 1734)
September 29 - Michael Dahl, Swedish portrait painter (died 1743)
December 12 - Francesco Galli Bibiena, Italian architect/painter (died 1739)
date unknown
Faustino Bocchi, Italian painter, active in Brescia, who specialized in bizarre paintings of dwarfs (died 1742)
Niccolò Cassana, Italian painter born in Venice (died 1714)
Giovanni Paolo Castelli, Italian painter, active in Rome painting still-life paintings of bowls of fruit and flowers (died 1730)
Giovanni Girolamo Frezza, Italian engraver (died 1730)
Bernard Lens II, English engraver, pioneer of mezzotint technique, and publisher (died 1725)
Krzysztof Lubieniecki, Polish Baroque  painter and engraver (died 1729)
Giovanni Battista Marmi. Italian painter (died 1686)
John Baptist Medina, Flemish-Spanish portrait painter and illustrator of Paradise Lost (died 1710)
Thomas van der Wilt, Dutch painter (died 1733)
Catharina Ykens, Flemish Baroque painter (died unknown)

Deaths
January 1 - Giovanni Martinelli, Italian painter of allegorical frescoes (died 1600/1604)
February - Willem Drost, Dutch Baroque painter and printmaker (born 1633)
October – Valerio Castello, Italian painter (born 1624)
date unknown
Pedro de Obregón, Spanish painter and printmaker (born 1597)
Jacques Fouquier, Flemish landscape painter (born 1591)
Filippo Gagliardi, Italian painter, active mainly in Rome (date of birth unknown)
Jean Lemaire, French painter (born 1598)
Giovanni Pietro Possenti, Italian painter of battle scenes (born 1618)
Frans Wouters, Flemish Baroque painter (born 1612)

 
Years of the 17th century in art
1650s in art